The Chinchorro mummies are mummified remains of individuals from the South American Chinchorro culture, found in what is now northern Chile. They are the oldest examples of artificially mummified human remains, having been buried up to two thousand years before the Egyptian mummies. The earliest mummy that has been found in Egypt dated around 3000 BCE, while the oldest anthropogenically modified Chinchorro mummy dates from around 5050 BCE.

The oldest naturally mummified corpse recovered from the Atacama Desert is dated around 7020 BCE.

Shell midden and bone chemistry suggest that 90% of the people's diet was seafood. Many ancient cultures of fisherfolk existed, tucked away in the arid river valleys of the Andes, but the Chinchorro made themselves unique by their dedicated preservation of the dead.

The Chinchorro culture settlements and artificial mummification process in Arica and Parinacota were declared a World Heritage Site by UNESCO in 2021.

Chinchorro mummification 
While many cultures throughout the world have sought to focus on preserving the dead elite, the Chinchorro tradition performed mummification on all members of their society, making them archaeologically significant. The decision of egalitarian preservation is proven in the mummification of the relatively less productive  members of society (meaning those who could not contribute to the welfare of others; the elderly, children, infants and miscarried fetuses). It is often the case that children and babies received the most elaborate mummification treatments.

Chronology
29% of known Chinchorro mummies were mummified naturally. The earliest one, the Acha man, dates to 7020 BCE.

The artificial mummies of Chinchorro are believed to have first appeared around 5000 BCE and reached a peak around 3000 BCE. Often Chinchorro mummies were elaborately prepared by removing the internal organs and replacing them with vegetable fibers or animal hair. In some cases, an embalmer would remove the skin and flesh from the dead body and replace them with clay. The mummies continued to be made until about 1800 BCE, making them contemporary with Las Vegas culture and Valdivia culture in Ecuador and the Norte Chico civilization in Peru.

Research
Since 1914, when Max Uhle began his work in Arica, an estimated 282 mummies have been found by archaeologists.  Morro-I, at the base of the Morro de Arica, revealed 96 bodies at the unstratified (i.e., there are no discernible layers of stratigraphy, hindering relative dating techniques), mostly loose sand at the slope of the hill. Fifty-four adults were found: 27 female, 20 male and 7 of indeterminate sex; 42 children were also found: 7 female, 12 male, 23 indeterminate. This sample size suggests that the Chinchorro did not favor mummifying one sex over others.

The mummies may have served as a means of assisting the soul in surviving, and to prevent the bodies from frightening the living. A more commonly accepted theory is that there was an ancestor cult of sorts, since there is evidence of both the bodies traveling with the groups and placed in positions of honor during major rituals and a delay in the final burial itself. Also, the bodies (which were always found in the extended position) were elaborately decorated and colored (even later repainted), and are thought to be reinforced and stiffened in order to be carried on reed litters and consequently displayed. However, since the society is a preceramic one, as well as slightly nomadic, it is somewhat difficult to determine through archaeological records the reasons why the Chinchorro felt the need to mummify the dead.

The representatives of the Chinchorro culture was determined by mitochondrial haplogroup A2.

Dr. Bernardo Arriaza is a Chilean physical anthropologist who contributed a lot of the knowledge about Chinchorro mummification. Starting in 1984, he published numerous studies on the subject. In 1994, Arriaza created a classification of the Chinchorro mummies that is widely used. His book "Beyond Death: The Chinchorro Mummies of Ancient Chile" was published by the Smithsonian and also translated into Spanish.

Preparation of mummies 

While the overall manner in which the Chinchorro mummified their dead changed over the years, several traits remained constant throughout their history. In excavated mummies, archaeologists found skin and all soft tissues and organs, including the brain, removed from the corpse. After the soft tissues had been removed, sticks reinforced bones while the skin was stuffed with vegetable matter before reassembling the corpse. The mummy received a clay mask even if the mummy was already completely covered in dried clay; a process which the body was wrapped in reeds left to dry out for 30 to 40 days.

Techniques 
Uhle categorized the types of mummification he saw into three categories: simple treatment, complex treatment, and mud-coated mummies. He believed that these occurred chronologically, the mummification process becoming more complex as time went on. Since then, archaeologists have expanded upon this explanation and have (for the most part) agreed upon the following types of mummification: natural, black, red, mud-coated and bandage mummies. Mummification can also be described as externally prepared mummies, internally prepared mummies (Egyptian Pharos), and reconstructed mummies (the Chinchorro), according to Andean Archaeologists.  Further, it turns out that the types of mummification used overlap with each other, and mummies of different types have been found all in the same tomb. The two most common techniques used in Chinchorro mummification were the Black mummies and the Red mummies.

Natural mummification
Of the 282 Chinchorro mummies found thus far, 29% of them were results of the natural mummification process (7020 BC-1300 BCE). In northern Chile, environmental conditions greatly favor natural mummification. The soil is very rich in nitrates which, when combined with other factors such as the aridity of the Atacama Desert, ensure organic preservation. Salts halt bacterial growth; the hot, dry conditions facilitate rapid desiccation, evaporating all bodily fluids of the corpses. Soft tissues, as a result, dry before they decay and a naturally preserved mummy is left. Even though the Chinchorro people did not mummify the bodies artificially, the bodies were still buried wrapped in reeds with grave goods.

The black mummy technique
The black mummy technique (5000 to 3000 BCE) involved taking the dead person's body apart, treating it, and reassembling it. The head, arms, and legs were removed from the trunk; the skin was often removed, too. The body was heat-dried, and the flesh and tissue were completely stripped from the bone by using stone tools. Evidence exists that the bones were dried by hot ashes or coal. After reassembly, the body was then covered with a white ash paste, filling the gaps with grass, ashes, soil, animal hair and more. The paste was also used to fill out the person's normal facial features. The person's skin (including facial skin with a wig attachment of short black human hair) was refitted on the body, sometimes in smaller pieces, sometimes in one almost-whole piece. Sea lion skin was sometimes used as well. Then the skin (or, in the case of children, who were often missing their skin layer, the white ash layer) was painted with black manganese giving their color.

The red mummy technique
The red mummy technique (2500 BCE to 2000 BCE) was a technique in which rather than disassemble the body, many incisions were made in the trunk and shoulders to remove internal organs and dry the body cavity. The head was cut from the body so that the brain could be removed, after which the skin would be pasted back on, which would often just be covered with a clay mask. The body was packed with various materials to return it to somewhat more-normal dimensions, sticks used to strengthen it, and the incisions sewn up using reed cord. The head was placed back on the body, this time with a wig made from tassels of human hair up to 60 cm long. A "hat" made out of black clay held the wig in place. Except for the wig and often the (black) face, everything was then painted with red ochre.

Mud coat
The final style of Chinchorro mummification was the mud-coat (3000-1300 BCE). Ecologically speaking, at the time of the Chinchorro culture the region was relatively stable. It has been suggested by environmentalists that the incredible preservation of these mummies is also influenced by the pedogenic (the evolution of soil) creation of clays and gypsum, which act as cementing agents, and the latter as a natural desiccant. The malleable clay allowed for the morticians to mold and create the colorful appearances of mummies, with the added bonus of the fact that the foul smell of the desiccating mummy would be covered.   Artisans no longer removed the organs of the dead; instead a thick coat of mud, sand and a binder like egg or fish glue was used to cover the bodies. Once completed the mummies were cemented into their graves. The change in style may have come from exposure to outsiders and their different cultures, or from the association of disease with the rotting corpses.

Bandage technique
The bandage technique (guessed to be 2620-2000 BCE, but there is a lack of radiocarbon dating) has only been found to be present in three infants. The technique is a mixture of black and red mummies, in that the body was taken apart and reinforced in the style of black mummies but the head was treated in the same way as red mummies are. Animal and human skin were used to wrap the body in the place of clay. Further, the bodies were found to be painted with red ocher while the heads were painted with black manganese.

Tattooing
At least one Chinchorro mummy bears remarkable witness to the antiquity of tattooing in the region. The remains of a male with a mustache-like dotted line tattooed above his upper lip and dating to 1880 +/- 100 BCE (2563–1972 cal BCE) is believed to represent the oldest direct evidence of tattooing in the Americas and the fourth-oldest such evidence in the world.

See also 

Burial ritual
Cultural periods of Peru
Mummy
Mummy Juanita

References

Bibliography
Arthur C. Aufderheide, The Scientific Study of Mummies. Cambridge University Press, 2003  p. 142
Bernardo Arriaza, Chile’s Chinchorro Mummies nationalgeographic.com 1995

External links 
Chinchorro Archaeological site in Chile
"Making the Dead Beautiful: Mummies as Art" Archaeology Magazine
Chinchorro and other mummies
Cultura Chinchorro Momias Chinchorro
"Mummies in Peru" American Museum of Natural History site
"Living with the world's oldest mummies" BBC News Article

Andean mummies
Human remains (archaeological)
History of South America
Archaeology of Chile
Archaeology of Peru
Indigenous culture of the Andes
Andean preceramic
World Heritage Sites in Chile